The Bulgarian Posts are the national postal service of Bulgaria. The company was established in 1992. Although it was transformed into a joint-stock company in 1997, it is fully owned by the state.

Its predecessor, the Bulgarian Posts and Telecommunications company, was founded as the Bulgarian Posts and Telegraphs after the Liberation of Bulgaria from Ottoman rule, as the provisional Russian administration handed over all post and telegraph offices to the newly restored Bulgarian state in 1879. It joined the General Postal Union in the same year. On March 31, 1997, "Bulgarian Posts" EOOD was transformed into a joint-stock company.

In 2005, the company operated with 3,008 post offices and a total length of 80,060 km with the postal route. The company was a monopoly in the country in providing universal postal service until 2006.

, Bulgarian Posts reported operating 2,981 post offices and 4,814 mailboxes.

See also 
 Postage stamps and postal history of Bulgaria
 Bulgarian Postbank

References

External links
 Official website

Government-owned companies of Bulgaria
Postal organizations
Communications in Bulgaria
1879 establishments in Bulgaria
Philately of Bulgaria
Companies established in 1879